St. Matthew Catholic Church is a parish of the Roman Catholic Church in the Ballantyne neighborhood of Charlotte, North Carolina, in the Diocese of Charlotte. As of 2017, it is one of the largest Catholic parishes in the United States, with over 10,500 registered families.

History 

On September 21, 1986, the Roman Catholic Diocese of Charlotte announced the plan for a new church. The congregation, then made up of 237 families, originally met for Mass in the Tower Theater.

In 2017 St. Matthew's had 35,599 registered members, making up 13.7 percent of the entire population of the Diocese of Charlotte. It has been described as a Catholic megachurch. St. Matthew's clergy and staff reportedly observed ministerial methods and management strategies from Protestant evangelical megachurches, including Saddleback Church. The church operates a satellite campus in Waxhaw, called St. Matthew South.

The church, which is run by the Order of Friars Minor Capuchin, claims to be welcoming to divorced Catholics as well as LGBTQ Catholics, and emphasizes the teachings and culture of the Second Vatican Council.

In 1999 Fr. Robert Yurgel, a priest at St. Matthew's, sexually abused a fourteen-year-old altar boy. Yurgel was removed from the Capuchin order and defrocked from the Catholic priesthood in 2010. He was arrested in 2009 after pleading guilty to second-degree sexual offense.

References

External links 

 

1982 establishments in North Carolina
Religious organizations established in 1982
Churches in Charlotte, North Carolina
Franciscan churches in the United States
Roman Catholic churches in North Carolina
Roman Catholic Diocese of Charlotte